The Virginia Square Shopping Center in Arlington County, Virginia, United States opened in early 1952, to complement the adjoining Kann's-Virginia store.  At opening, the 15-store center included a Giant supermarket, People's Drug, Fanny Farmer candy, L. Frank Co. women's apparel, Jonas men's apparel, the Bo Peep Shop, and Mary Baynes Gift Shop.  An F.W. Woolworth variety store also operated at the center.  Following the 1975 closure of the Kann's-Virginia and Kimel's Furniture Store, the center entered into a period of decline.  In March 1986, the Virginia Square retail landmark Mary Baynes Gift Shop closed its doors.  Redevelopment of the Center, talked about for almost a decade, finally commenced in Summer 1988, when the Federal Deposit Insurance Corporation demolished the old center and erected a new satellite office and other buildings on the site.

The Virginia Square–GMU station on the Washington Metro is named after the shopping center.

References 

Demolished shopping malls in the United States
Defunct shopping malls in the United States
Shopping malls established in 1952
1952 establishments in Virginia
1988 disestablishments in Virginia